The men's hammer throw event at the 1990 World Junior Championships in Athletics was held in Plovdiv, Bulgaria, at Deveti Septemvri Stadium on 11 August.  A 7257g (senior implement) hammer was used.

Medalists

Results

Final
11 August

Participation
According to an unofficial count, 13 athletes from 9 countries participated in the event.

References

Hammer throw
Hammer throw at the World Athletics U20 Championships